River Oaks Garden Club Forum of Civics is a building at 2503 Westheimer Road in Houston, Texas, United States listed in the National Register of Historic Places as the "Forum of Civics."

The building is located south of the River Oaks neighborhood in the Upper Kirby district.

History
Built in 1910, the building, known as John Smith County School, served as a county schoolhouse. John F. Staub remodeled the building to serve as the headquarters of the Forum of Civics, an organization founded by Will Hogg. In 1939 the Hogg estate bequeathed the Forum of Civics to the University of Texas. River Oaks Garden Club has owned the building since 1942. The building received listing in the National Register of Historic Places on October 13, 1988.

See also

River Oaks, Houston

References

National Register of Historic Places in Houston
Buildings and structures in Houston
History of Houston
Buildings and structures completed in 1910
Clubhouses on the National Register of Historic Places in Texas
Recorded Texas Historic Landmarks
River Oaks, Houston